Samuel James Harrison (born 7 April 1990 in Leicester, England) is an English former rugby union footballer who played 178 games as a scrum-half for Leicester Tigers between 2008 and 2020.

Club career
His first appearance for Leicester Tigers came as a replacement at home against Benetton Treviso in the Heineken Cup.

He was dual-registered with Nottingham for the 2009–10 season, and Harry Ellis's return from injury saw Harrison kept to a bench spot whilst the Leicester A team played in the Guinness A League.

Ellis's retirement in July 2010 resulted in Harrison's promotion to the full-time Leicester squad. Harrison played as a replacement during the 2013 Premiership final as Leicester defeated Northampton Saints. 

Harrison is an ambassador for Dorothy Goodman School, a Special Educational Needs school in Hinckley, Leicestershire.

In 2016/17, his versatility earned him brief cover spells as fly half during periods of injury to both Freddie Burns and Owen Williams, even standing in as a goalkicker.

On 24 October 2019 Harrison announced his intention to retire aged only 29, to move to the Gold Coast, Australia and become a carpenter.  His final appearance was on 4 January 2020 at Welford Road in a 31-18 win against Bristol Bears, Harrison had the last act of the match by clearing the ball to touch to end the game.

International career
Harrison has featured in the England U16, U18 and U20 squads.

References

External links
 England U20 profile
 Leicester profile

1990 births
Living people
English rugby union players
Rugby union players from Leicester
Leicester Tigers players
Rugby union scrum-halves